The Richest Africans is an annual ranking of the richest African people, compiled and published by the American business magazine Forbes. The list has been published since 2015. Dangote Group founder Aliko Dangote has topped the 2018 list. In 2018, there was a record of 23 African billionaires on the list. Billionaires who are from Africa, but do not reside in the continent (such as Elon Musk and Mo Ibrahim) are excluded from the list by Forbes.

Annual rankings 
2023

As of 2023, Nigerian billionaire Aliko Dangote is the richest person in Africa, and the African countries with the most billionaires are Egypt (5), South Africa (6), Nigeria (3), and Morocco (2)

2021 
As of 2021, Nigerian billionaire Aliko Dangote is the richest person in Africa, and the African countries with the most billionaires are Egypt (5), South Africa (5), Nigeria (3), and Morocco (2).

2019 

The 2020 billionaires' list was released by Forbes on 14 January 2020. Also, the Forbes provides daily net worth updates which reflects change by 5 PM ET of prior trading day.

See also
 Lists of billionaires
 List of countries by the number of billionaires

References

External links 
Africa's Billionaires, Forbes
The World's Billionaires, Forbes
Rich List Index, CEOWORLD magazine
The richest people in Africa, LocalFobs.com

Lists of people by wealth
Net worth
Economy of Africa-related lists